Folk biology or folkbiology is the cognitive study of how people classify and reason about the organic world. Humans everywhere classify animals and plants into obvious species-like groups. The relationship between a folk taxonomy and a scientific classification can assist in understanding how evolutionary theory deals with the apparent constancy of "common species" and the organic processes centering on them. From the vantage of evolutionary psychology, such natural systems are arguably routine "habits of mind", a sort of heuristic used to make sense of the natural world.

References

External links 
 Scott Atran (1999) Folkbiology (PDF), in Robert Wilson and Frank Keil, Ed. The MIT Encyclopedia of the Cognitive Sciences, pages 316-317. MIT Press.

Branches of biology
Ethnobiology
Evolutionary psychology
Scientific folklore